"Grace" is the fourth episode of the first season of the TNT science fiction drama Falling Skies, which originally aired July 3, 2011.
The episode was written by Melinda Hsu Taylor and directed by Fred Toye.

Tom and his team are sent to scout out an old motorcycle shop, and Weaver insists he take Pope along. After arriving at the store, Pope manages to escape and attacks a nest of sleeping Skitters, attracting the attention of nearby Mechs. Meanwhile, Anne attempts to communicate with the captured Skitter.

Plot 
The Skitter that Tom captured is being held in a cage. Anne and Harris are given the task of studying it. The Skitter seemed to become angrier by the sight of Tom, who tells it that he remembers him.
Pope tells Weaver that there is a motorcycle shop nearby. He tells Tom to take a team to get the bikes. Tom reluctantly agrees to let Pope accompany them.

Tom, Hal, Dai, Anthony, and Pope set out on a country road. Tom tells Dai that he worries about his sons. Tom says that his wife could have handled the situation with Hal better than him.

Anne shows the Skitter pictures, hoping to learn how to communicate with it. Harris thinks this is a waste of time. Scott shows Weaver a radio he made. Matt is given the responsibility of monitoring communications on the radio.

On their hunt for bikes, the group see a group of Skitters sleeping upside down like bats. Pope wants to shoot them down, but Tom decides to leave them alone after Dai reports that there are Mechs nearby.

Anne starts to give the Skitter water to drink as Harris walks in with the dead Skitter that Pope and his gang killed. This aggravates the Skitter that is still alive. Before eating, Lourdes says a prayer. Weaver notices her and tells her she is lucky to still "believe in something."

At the motorcycle shop, the gang prepares to get the bikes. Hal finds a locket that Karen would have liked. Tom and Hal talk about Karen. Both Tom and Hal agree that Hal's mother was always better at this parenting thing than Tom.

Back at the high school, Harris prepares to cut into the Skitter. Anne tells him he can't do that because the Skitter is a living creature. She says their job is to learn to communicate with the Skitter, not to kill it, but Harris disagrees.

Mike's son Rick wakes up but doesn't recognize his father. Mike confronts the Skitter and threatens to kill it if it doesn't begin communicating with him. When the Skitter does not begin communicating with Mike, Mike thrusts his gun into the Skitter's mouth. The Skitter falls unconscious to the ground. Harris tells Anne and Mike that he found a "pressure point" near the Skitter's soft palate. Anne notices that interference came onto the radio both times the Skitter was provoked and theorizes that Skitters may have "radios in their heads" that they use to communicate with each other. However, while the Skitters communicate at radio-frequencies, their communications only have roughly the same range as a human voice, so the captured Skitter cannot alert the other aliens.  Anne attempts to perform an autopsy on the old Skitter corpse from Pope's hideout, but it has been dead for too long, and the insides have already rotted into "mush."

As the gang prepares to leave the motorbike store, Pope knocks Dai out and escapes on a motorcycle. He goes back to the sleeping Skitters and blows them up with a few grenades attached to a can of gasoline.

Rick wakes up and reattaches the "harness" to his back. Scott's radio experiences interference waves at this time and Mike runs in to find Rick about to let the Skitter out. Harris communicates with the Skitter through Rick, asking the Skitter through Rick what the Skitter wants from them. Mike runs over and rips the "harness" off his son, knocking his son out.

A group of armed "harnessed kids" finds Tom and the others. The kids fire, shooting Dai in the leg. Anthony suggests that they shoot back, but Tom says no. The kids move together, only shooting when there is a target. Tom makes a Molotov cocktail and throws it under a car. The kids open fire on the car. Hal and Anthony get away, but Tom and Dai are ambushed by a Skitter. Dai kills it, and they drive away.

Tom tells Weaver that he will look for the drugs needed for the operations and then go look for Ben. Weaver says that if his child was still alive, nothing on earth could keep him from going after him. Tom and Hal talk about Ben. Hal mentions that he's worried that Ben will be different when he gets back. Tom tells Hal that Ben is strong. Later, Tom goes to eat and is surprised to see fresh bread. Margaret tells him that it's a parting gift from Pope. Around the table, Tom, Hal, Matt, Dai, Anthony, Anne, and Lourdes share what they are thankful for and then hold hands and pray before their meal. Weaver, sitting at the next table, quietly whispers along with them.

Production

Development 
The episode was written by Melinda Hsu Taylor and it was directed by Fred Toye. Melinda Hsu Taylor later writes the second part of the two part Sanctuary episode. Fred Toye later directs Silent Kill.

Greg Beeman stated in his blog that a difficult production problem the crew faced were the scenes involving the caged Skitter. The Skitter was designed and built by Todd Masters in Vancouver. Beeman stated that the alien "really looked real on set and it worked flawlessly." In Prisoner of War the Skitter that attacked Tom was a full-scale animatronic puppet. It took five people to operate it. The crew shot the episode in the summer and "the guy inside the suit was buried beneath six inches of foam rubber." The Skitter suit caused him to heat up quickly. He could only go ten or fifteen minutes between takes, at which time he would need to take a break, which was time consuming.

Reception

Ratings 
In its original American broadcast, "Grace" was seen by an estimated 4.07 million household viewers, according to Nielsen Media Research. "Grace" received a 1.4 rating among viewers between ages 18 and 49, which is down a tenth versus the previous episode’s 1.5 rating.

Reviews 
The A.V. Club gave the episode a B−.

Matt Richenthal from TV Fanatic said of the episode: "Not every episode can feature a major battle between the survivors and the aliens, for both production reasons and storyline reasons. The show wouldn't last half a season if that were the case.
But Falling Skies has done a strong enough job building up characters that "Grace" felt like more than filler.

References 

2011 American television episodes
Falling Skies (season 1) episodes